Kanskoye is a rural locality (a village) in Vysokovskoye Rural Settlement, Ust-Kubinsky  District, Vologda Oblast, Russia. The population was 11 as of 2002. There are 3 streets.

Geography 
Kanskoye is located 11 km northeast of Ustye (the district's administrative centre) by road. Ananyino is the nearest rural locality.

References 

Rural localities in Tarnogsky District